Angles Without Edges is the first album released by hip hop producer Madlib's jazz project, Yesterdays New Quintet. Presented as a fictional quintet or virtual band, Yesterdays New Quintet consists of members Monk Hughes, Ahmad Miller, Joe McDurfey, Malik Flowers, and Otis Jackson Jr, all of which are pseudonyms used by Madlib (except for the latter, which is the producer's legal name).  The album was released in 2001 under Stones Throw Records on compact disc and vinyl record.

While not entirely devoid of samples from other music, Madlib used this album to experiment with live instrumentation, recording in his studio and arranging the recordings together.

Track listing
All tracks produced by Madlib.

Personnel
Credits adopted from liner notes.
 Yesterdays New Quintet – keyboards, synthesizers, vibraphone, electric bass, kalimba, drums, percussion, electric guitar, clavinet, samples, loops, omnichord, programming 
 Jeff Jank – design
 Peanut Butter Wolf – executive producer
 Dave Tompkins – liner notes
 Gene Grimaldi – mastering
 B+ – photography

Song appearances 
From 2004 to 2010, several songs from Angles Without Edges appeared as background music in commercial bumpers on Adult Swim, including "Sun Goddess", "Daylight", "Paladium", "Life's Angles", "Little Girl (Dakota's Song)", "Keeper of My Soul", "Rugged Tranquility", "Papa", "The One Who Knows", "Uno Esta", "Julani", "Mestizo Eyes", "Hot Water", "The Birth of YNQ", and "Kuhn's Theme".

References

2001 debut albums
Madlib albums
Stones Throw Records albums